Lochinvar is a loch in southern Scotland.

Lochinvar may also refer to the following:

Places
 Lochinvar, New South Wales,  town in Australia
 Lochinvar (Pontotoc, Mississippi), 19th-century plantation, listed on the U.S. National Register of Historic Places in Mississippi
 Lochinvar National Park, Zambia

Other uses
 Song by New Riders of the Purple Sage on album "Powerglide"
 Lochinvar Corporation, producer of water heaters
 Water transport;
 HMS Lochinvar, name shared in turn by one ship and two shore establishments of the Royal Navy
 MV Lochinvar, ferry operated by Caledonian MacBrayne
 Lochinvar, fictional characters:
 In Walter Scott's poem, Marmion
 In 1924 film Young Lochinvar
 Lord Lochinvar, title in the peerage of Scotland

See also
 Lochinver, a village in northern Scotland